Michelle Lee (born September 9, 1991) is a South Korean-American singer. After successfully auditioning for K-pop Star Season 1 in 2011, she was eventually signed to YG Entertainment as part of a new girl group called SuPearls. However, after two years of training, the group was suddenly disbanded before they could debut and Lee's contract was nullified.

She is now signed to DIMA Entertainment, the affiliate agency of her alma mater, the Dong-ah Institute of Media and Arts.

Biography

Early life
Michelle Lee was born September 9, 1991, in Paju, South Korea, to a Korean mother and an African-American father. She grew up in Paju with her older sister and mother, as her father returned to the United States prior to her birth following her parents' separation.

Since the age of five, Lee and her sister would listen to their mother's H.O.T. and Toni Braxton cassette tapes while trying to match their voices to the pitch of the tune, occasionally even trying to learn the dance moves. However, like fellow Black-Korean musicians Insooni and Yoon Mi-rae, Lee faced constant discrimination for her biracial identity in school. Her debut single, "Without You", centers around the bullying she suffered.

Lee admits to never have left South Korean soil, and occasionally struggles with English.

2011-2012: Career beginnings, K-pop Star, and SuPearls
In 2011, she became a participant in the worldwide K-pop Star music audition/competition. She has been praised for her powerful voice, wide range, and mature singing skill. She gathered early praise from the 3 judges who are also representatives of  SM, YG, and JYP,  and was recognized as a strong contender to win the contest along with Park Ji-min.

During the group audition stages, the 4-person girl group of Michelle, Park Ji-min, Lee Seung-joo, and Lee Jung-mi drew rave reviews for their renditions of Girls' Generation's The Boys and Irene Cara's Fame, which resulted in all four members advancing to the next stage.

After the show she was signed by YG Entertainment and was initially scheduled to debut as a member of the girlgroup Supearls along with  Lee Jung Mi, Lee Seung Joo, and Lee Hi (who replaced Ji-min Park, who signed with JYP at the end of the show). For about two years, the girls underwent training at YG and performed at various small venues.

2013-present: SuPearls' disbandment, joining DIMA Entertainment, and Solo debut
On February 18, 2013, YG announced that plans for their debut had been dropped in order to focus on Lee Hi's solo career.

On March 28, 2013, it was officially reported that she had signed with DIMA Entertainment and would officially begin training to debut as a solo artist.

She was also featured on South Korean rapper Double K's single "Rewind" for his upcoming album. The music video and single were released on May 3, 2013.

Her debut single, "Without You" was released on March 21, 2014, by DIMA Entertainment and LOEN Entertainment. The music video for "Without You" features a young girl (portrayed by Egypt Yoona) writing racial slurs on a wall covered with graffiti. In some scenes, the child dabs her face with white powder in an attempt to give herself lighter skin. Upon discovering her music was posted on Melon, Lee's pent up emotions from childhood "just hit me at once and I just starting crying. I was on the phone with my older sister and we couldn't help ourselves, we just both started crying together."

2015: First Mini-Album "I Can Sing"
On August 4, Michelle released her first mini-album "I Can Sing". The album was primarily written by Michelle and once again was a personal message of strength to others.

2016: Tribe of Hip hop 2
Michelle participated in Tribe of Hip hop 2, and her performance earned her the moniker of Korean Missy Elliott. She is currently on SESESE House.

Discography

K-pop Star Tracks

Solo Debut

"Without You" (2014)

"That's Okay" (2014)

"I Can Sing" (2015)

"ALOLA!" (2017) (Opening for Pokémon: Sun & Moon anime) sung with Yeom Jaeok (TV version)

"Life Is" (2018)

"Day-By-Day" (2020)

Filmography

Television

References

External links

1991 births
Living people
People from Paju
21st-century South Korean singers
South Korean female idols
Dong-ah Institute of Media and Arts alumni
K-pop Star participants
South Korean educators
South Korean women pop singers
South Korean rhythm and blues singers
South Korean people of African-American descent
21st-century South Korean educators
21st-century South Korean women singers